General Edmund Phipps (7 April 1760 – 14 September 1837) was a senior British Army officer and Member of Parliament.

He was born in London, the fourth son of Constantine Phipps, 1st Baron Mulgrave and was the younger brother of Constantine John Phipps, 2nd Baron Mulgrave, Hon. Charles Phipps and Henry Phipps, 1st Earl of Mulgrave. He was educated at Eton College (1771–73) and St John's College, Cambridge (1778-80).

He entered the Army in 1780 as an ensign in the 85th Regiment of Foot, became a lieutenant in the 88th Foot and then a captain in the 93rd Foot. In 1782 he was appointed aide-de-camp to the Governor of Gibraltar. He transferred as a captain to the 1st Foot Guards and was a.d.c. to the Lord Lieutenant of Ireland from 1784 to 1787. He was promoted brevet-colonel in 1796, major-general in 1801 and lieutenant-general in 1808. In 1807 he was appointed colonel-commandant of both the 2nd and 3rd battalions of the 60th (Royal American) Regiment of Foot (later the Kings Royal Rifle Corps), a position he held until his death. He was made full general on 12 August 1819.

He also held the positions of Paymaster and Inspector-General of the Marines (1810-1812) and Clerk of the Deliveries of the Ordnance (1812-30).

When his elder brother was elevated to the peerage he inherited his Parliamentary seat for Scarborough, holding the seat himself from 1794 to 1818. He was subsequently elected to represent Queenborough from 1818 to 1820 and Scarborough again from 1820 to 1832.

He died unmarried in 1837 in Venice.

References

|-

|-

1760 births
1837 deaths
Edmund
People educated at Eton College
Alumni of St John's College, Cambridge
British Army generals
Members of the Parliament of Great Britain for English constituencies
British MPs 1790–1796
British MPs 1796–1800
Members of the Parliament of the United Kingdom for English constituencies
Younger sons of barons
UK MPs 1801–1802
UK MPs 1802–1806
UK MPs 1806–1807
UK MPs 1807–1812
UK MPs 1812–1818
UK MPs 1818–1820
UK MPs 1820–1826
UK MPs 1826–1830
UK MPs 1830–1831
UK MPs 1831–1832